Megachile dinura is a species of bee in the family Megachilidae. It was described by Theodore Dru Alison Cockerell in 1911.

References

Dinura
Insects described in 1911